Stearyl heptanoate, the ester of stearyl alcohol and heptanoic acid (enanthic acid), is found in most cosmetic eyeliner. It is prepared from stearyl alcohol, which may be derived from sperm whale oil or from vegetable sources.

Stearyl heptanoate is added to cosmetics to act as an emollient.

References

Enanthate esters